Dorcadion sericatum is a species of beetle in the family Cerambycidae. It was described by Sahlberg in 1823. It is known from Ukraine.

References

sericatum
Beetles described in 1823